Dominium is the first studio album by the Portuguese death metal band Malevolence.

Track listing

 "DESESPERO"
 "DOMINION OF HATE"
 "THE BURNING PICTURE"
 "UNDER INHUMAN TOUCH"
 "ENCHANTED MASK"
 "SWALLOWED IN BLACK"
 "MY EYES (THRONE OF TEARS)"
 "SWEET BLOODY VISION"
 "EROTICA"
 "CEREMONIAL GALLERY"

1996 albums
Malevolence (band) albums